William Erskine Knowles (November 28, 1872 – July 17, 1951) was a Canadian politician.

Born in Alliston, Ontario, Knowles was educated at Osgoode Hall Law School in Toronto, Ontario. A lawyer by profession, he was first elected to the House of Commons of Canada for the electoral district of Assiniboia West in a by-election held on February 6, 1906. A Liberal, he was re-elected in 1908 and 1911 for the electoral district of Moose Jaw. He did not run in 1917. From 1918 to 1927, he was a member of the Legislative Assembly of Saskatchewan. From 1918 to 1921, he was the Provincial Secretary and from 1919 to 1921 he was the Minister of Telephones. He attempted a federal comeback in the 1921 and 1923 elections but was defeated.

Knowles resigned his seat in the Saskatchewan assembly in 1927 after he was named a judge.

Electoral results (partial)

References
 
 The Canadian Parliament; biographical sketches and photo-engravures of the senators and members of the House of Commons of Canada. Being the tenth Parliament, elected November 3, 1904

1872 births
1951 deaths
Liberal Party of Canada MPs
Members of the House of Commons of Canada from Saskatchewan
Politicians from Simcoe County
Saskatchewan Liberal Party MLAs
Judges in Saskatchewan